Didrik Tønseth may refer to:

 Didrik Tønseth (diplomat) (born 1944), Norwegian diplomat and lawyer
 Didrik Tønseth (skier) (born 1991), Norwegian cross-country skier

See also
 Diderik Iversen Tønseth, Norwegian politician